The COVID-19 pandemic in Nauru is part of the ongoing worldwide pandemic of coronavirus disease 2019 (COVID-19) caused by severe acute respiratory syndrome coronavirus 2 (SARS-CoV-2). The virus was confirmed to have reached Nauru on 2 April 2022.

Background
The government declared a national emergency as a preventive measure, suspending all but one weekly flight to the country and instituting a 14-day quarantine for all arrivals.

On 14 December, a historical case was identified on a shipping vessel. Since the case remained on board, it is not considered to have entered Nauru.

As of 2 May 2022 in reporting to the WHO, there have been five confirmed COVID-19 cases; 22,976 vaccines doses have been administered, accounting for 79% of the population with two doses and 49% with the booster.

Timeline

April to June 2022 
 On 2 April 2022, Nauru recorded its first two cases of COVID-19.
 As of 5 April 2022, three cases were detected in Nauru. This outbreak was quickly contained, and no further transmission occurred.
 At the end of April 2022, two other cases were detected from incoming travelers and were contained in a quarantine facility.
 As of 12 May 2022, there were seven total cases in Nauru, with four active cases and three recoveries.
 As of 16 May 2022, there were eight total cases in Nauru, with three active cases and five cures.
 As of 26 May 2022, there were eight total cases in Nauru, all of them cured from the virus.
 As of 13 June 2022, there were 13 total cases in Nauru, with one active cases and 12 recoveries.
 As of 21 June 2022, Nauru had reported its first community case. In addition, a total of 337 have tested positive for COVID-19.
 As of 22 June 2022, there were 618 total cases in Nauru, with 606 active cases and 12 recoveries.
 As of 23 June 2022, there were 873 total cases in Nauru, with 861 active cases and 12 recoveries.
 As of 24 June 2022, there were 1,060 total cases in Nauru, with 1,048 active cases and 12 recoveries.
 As of 25 June 2022, there were 1,484 total cases in Nauru, with 1,472 active cases and 12 recoveries.
 As of 26 June 2022, there were 2,114 total cases in Nauru, with 2,102 active cases and 12 recoveries.
 As of 27 June 2022, there were 2,404 total cases in Nauru, with 2,392 active cases and 12 recoveries.
 As of 28 June 2022, there were 2,780 total cases in Nauru, with 2,768 active cases and 12 recoveries.
 As of 29 June 2022, there were 3,173 total cases in Nauru, with 3,161 active cases and 12 recoveries.
 At the end of June 2022, there were 3,398 total cases in Nauru, with 3,381 active cases and 17 recoveries.

July to December 2022 
 As of 2 July 2022, there were 4,087 total cases in Nauru, with 3,838 active cases, 229 recoveries, and 1 death case.
 As of 2 July 2022, there were 4,088 total cases in Nauru, with 3,839 active cases, 229 recoveries, and 1 death case.
 As of 3 July 2022, there were 4,197 total cases in Nauru, with 3,808 active cases, 389 recoveries, and 1 death case.
 As of 4 July 2022, there were 4,447 total cases in Nauru, with 3,978 active cases, 469 recoveries, and 1 death case.
 As of 5 July 2022, there were 4,869 total cases in Nauru, with 4,128 active cases, 741 recoveries, and 1 person died.
 As of 6 July 2022, there were 5,009 total cases in Nauru, with 4,067 active cases, 942 recoveries, and 1 death case.
 As of 7 July 2022, there were 5,021 total cases in Nauru, with 4,079 active cases, 942 cures, and 1 death case.
 As of 8 July 2022, there were 5,685 total cases in Nauru, with 4,126 active cases, 1,559 cures, and 1 deaths.
 As of 9 July 2022, there were 6,409 total cases in Nauru, with 4,171 active cases, 2,238 recoveries, and 1 death case.
 As of 10 July 2022, there were 6,426 total cases in Nauru, with 4,019 active cases, 2,407 cures, and 1 fatal case.
 As of 11 July 2022, there were 6,904 total cases in Nauru, with 4,114 active cases, 2,790 recoveries, and 1 fatal case.
 As of 12 July 2022, there were 6,920 total cases in Nauru, with 4,130 active cases, 2,790 recoveries, and 1 death case.
 As of 13 July 2022, there were 6,932 total cases in Nauru, with 4,142 active cases, 2,790 recoveries, and 1 death case.
 As of 14 July 2022, there were 6,930 total cases, with 4,140 active cases, 3,171 recoveries, and 1 fatal case.
 As of 19 July 2022, there were 6,960 total cases, with 3,568 active cases, 3,391 cures, and 1 death.

Between July and September, Nauru was reporting accurate new cases, but incorrect total cases. They have now corrected this on their government Facebook and worldometers has as well.

 As of 26 August 2022, there were 4611 total cases, with 5 active cases, 4605 cures, and 1 death.

January 2023 onwards 
 As of 30 January 2023, there were 4621 total cases, with 11 active cases, 4609 cures, and 1 death.

See also
 COVID-19 pandemic in Oceania

References

 
Nauru
2020 in Nauru
2021 in Nauru
2022 in Nauru
Nauru